The Lotus 94T was a Formula One racing car used by Team Lotus in the second part of the 1983 Formula One season. The car was powered by the Renault Gordini EF1 V6-turbo engine, and ran on Pirelli tyres. The car was designed and built in only five weeks by the incumbent designer Gérard Ducarouge, who was brought into the team by boss Peter Warr in an attempt to stave off the uncompetitiveness of the previous Lotus cars.

The car featured a lower, slimmer monocoque with improved weight distribution over its predecessor. The 94T made its debut at the 1983 British Grand Prix and proved to be competitive in the hands of Nigel Mansell, who came home fourth in the race, and Elio de Angelis, and provided an upswing in form for the Lotus team which would carry them into the 1984 season with a developed version of the car. Its best result was a third-place at the 1983 European Grand Prix with Mansell, who also claimed the fastest lap in the race, while de Angelis won the pole position. De Angelis scored two points with the car, but Mansell made it into the top six on several occasions, and finished the season with 12 points to his credit.

Complete Formula One results
(key) (results in bold indicate pole position; results in italics indicate fastest lap)

* Lotus also used the 92 and 93T models in  but scored all points with the 94T; for the German Grand Prix Mansell used the 94T in practice but used the 93T in the race

References

1983 Formula One season cars
94T